Heidi Salminen (born 4 December 2003) is a Finnish athlete who specializes in the 400 metres hurdles. In 2021, still 17, she won a gold medal at the World Under 20 Championships as the first Finland's female track medallist ever at such world junior competitions. Heidi improved her pre-championship best by over two seconds, while all four other top women also achieved their lifetime bests.

Her personal best in the 400m hurdles is 56.94 seconds (2021 Nairobi).

References

External links 
 Heidi Salminen at World Athletics

2003 births
Living people
Finnish female hurdlers
Finnish female sprinters
World Athletics U20 Championships winners
People from Jyväskylä